"Weird" is a song written and performed by American pop rock band Hanson. It was the fourth single released from the band's major label debut album, Middle of Nowhere (1997), and became a moderate hit worldwide, charting within the top 20 in Australia, Canada, Finland, New Zealand, and the United Kingdom.

Chart performance
"Weird" performed well in the United Kingdom, peaking at number 19 on the UK Singles Chart and becoming their
fourth top-twenty hit there. It also did well on the Australian ARIA Singles Chart, charting at number 12, the Canadian RPM Top Singles chart, reaching number 11, and the New Zealand RIANZ Singles Chart, peaking at number 10. It charted the highest in Finland, where it rose to number four during its third week on the Finnish Singles Chart.

Music video
The music video for "Weird" was directed by Gus Van Sant. It features the band performing the song in a crowded subway and walking in Time Square, New York City. Many of the shots of the band in the subway were filmed in Brooklyn, New York at the New York Transit Museum.

Track listings
All songs were written by Isaac Hanson, Taylor Hanson, and Zac Hanson. Additional writers are in parentheses.

Canadian CD single and UK cassette single
 "Weird" (LP version)  – 3:59 (4:02 on cassette)
 "I Will Come to You" (Tee's Radio)  – 4:20

UK and European CD single
 "Weird" (album version)  – 4:02
 "I Will Come to You" (Tee's Radio)  – 4:20
 "Speechless"  – 4:20
 "I Will Come to You" (Tee's Frozen club mix)  – 7:47

Australian CD single
 "Weird" 
 "Weird" (Desmond Child mix) 
 "Weird" (Tom Lord-Alge mix) 
 "Yearbook"

Charts and certifications

Weekly charts

Year-end charts

Certifications

References

1997 songs
1998 singles
Hanson (band) songs
Mercury Records singles
Songs written by Desmond Child
Songs written by Isaac Hanson
Songs written by Taylor Hanson
Songs written by Zac Hanson